Padgett's Creek Baptist Church is a historic Southern Baptist church located at 843 Old Buncombe Rd, Union, South Carolina near Cross Keys, Union County, South Carolina. It was built between 1844 and 1848, and is a plain, rectangular two-story meeting house building over slightly raised brick supports. The front has a portico added in 1958. There is also a one-story rear addition.

It was added to the National Register of Historic Places in 1971.

References

External links
 
 Padgett's Creek Baptist Church Official Site

Baptist churches in South Carolina
Churches on the National Register of Historic Places in South Carolina
Churches completed in 1844
19th-century Baptist churches in the United States
Churches in Union County, South Carolina
National Register of Historic Places in Union County, South Carolina
Southern Baptist Convention churches